Upwey was a railway station on the Abbotsbury branch railway in the county of Dorset in England.

History

It was renamed Broadwey in 1896, then Broadwey (Dorset) in 1906 and finally the name was changed to Upwey in 1913, to avoid confusion with Broadway in Worcestershire.

Although it had a passenger platform, it mainly functioned as a goods depot as the location of Upwey Junction on an embankment made access difficult. There was a goods shed, cattle pens and a 5 ton crane.

The station was host to a GWR camp coach from 1936 to 1939. When the branch closed to passengers in 1952, the station continued on as a goods depot until 1962, served by a stub from what is now the South West Main Line.

Buildings
A typical William Clarke stone building served the single platform. The site of the station is now a builders yard with the station building and goods shed still in place.

References

Bibliography

Further reading 
  
   ISBN(no ISBN)

External links
 Station on navigable O.S. map location marked as Broadwey

Disused railway stations in Dorset
Former Great Western Railway stations
Railway stations in Great Britain opened in 1885
Railway stations in Great Britain closed in 1952